Paraceratitella eurycephala is a species of tephritid or fruit flies in the genus Paraceratitella of the family Tephritidae.

References

Dacinae